"Abdul Abulbul Amir" is the most common name for a music-hall song written in 1877 (during the Russo-Turkish War) under the title "Abdulla Bulbul Ameer" by Irish songwriter Percy French, and subsequently altered and popularized by a variety of other writers and performers. It tells the story of two valiant heroes—the titular Abdulla, fighting for the Turks, and his foe, Ivan Skavinsky Skavar (originally named Ivan Potschjinsky Skidar in French's version), a Russian warrior—who encounter each other, engage in verbal boasting, and are drawn into a duel in which both perish.

Percy French wrote the song  in 1877 for a smoking concert while studying at Trinity College Dublin. It was likely a comic opera spoof. "Pot Skivers" were the chambermaids at the college, thus Ivan "Potschjinski" Skivar would be a less than noble prince, and as Bulbul is an Arabic dialectic name of the nightingale, Abdul was thus a foppish "nightingale" amir (prince).

Variant names 
The names of the principal characters have been transcribed in a variety of ways in different versions of the lyrics.  The title character's last name appears as both "Ameer" and "Amir", and the syllable break between his first and middle names varies from version to version (originally "Abdulla Bulbul", as seen below, but often rendered as "Abdul Abulbul").

His Russian opponent's name has been more drastically modified over time.  First given as "Ivan Potschjinski Skidar", the character is perhaps best known today as "Ivan Skavinsky Skivar", with considerable variation in the spelling of both the middle and last names.

Lyrics
A great many versions of the lyrics exist, with the names of the principal characters spelled in a variety of ways. The following, presented by French's biographer James N. Healy, appears to be the most authoritative available text.  According to Healy, French sold his rights in the song for five pounds while failing to register his copyright to it, and subsequently discovered that a London publisher had produced an altered and unauthorized version which failed to identify French as the author.

Abdulla Bulbul Ameer

Abdullah Bul Bul Ameer 
Various versions varied to a greater or lesser degree from French's original. For instance, the lyric in the 1896 New Harvard Songbook makes several changes including the names of the principals:

Explicit version 
An obscene parody version of the song, in which Abdul and Ivan engage in a competition regarding who can have sex with more prostitutes in a given time, originated in the British military and is traditionally sung in rugby clubs.

Cartoon

The song was adapted in 1941 into an MGM cartoon, Abdul the Bulbul-Ameer, with Fred Quimby producing and direction by Hugh Harman. Voice acting for the nine-minute cartoon was provided by Johnny Murray, Harry Stanton, Leon Belasco and Hans Conried, while Frank Crumit wrote new lyrics. It features caricatures of Groucho Marx, Lou Costello and Al Ritz as news reporters.

In this version, Abdul is depicted as a bully who picks on Ivan's dwarf friend, provoking Ivan into treading on the Turk's toe. He has many traits of 1930s and 1940s cartoon villains, such as Bluto, including thick lips, a beard and a big belly. There is a brief swordfight, which soon changes into a brawl, that ends with Ivan and Abdul literally "out cold", after falling through a frozen lake and emerging frozen in a pillar of ice thanks to Ivan's friend who planted a bomb on Abdul and it is unknown if they are being thawed or not. The relatively sympathetic depiction of the Russian character is unlikely to have had any connection to then-current world events, as the cartoon was in production in 1940, and was released in February 1941, before the invasion of the USSR by Nazi Germany, and before the alliance with the UK, in June 1941.

Commercials
In the 1980s Whitbread brewery adapted the song using their own lyrics for a series of commercials on British television, suggesting that the two protagonists were great fans of their Whitbread Best beer who squabbled over trivialities such as what type of glassware to drink it from, because they had forgotten that "the best Best needs no etiquette". The commercials starred Stephen Fry as Ivan, Tony Cosmo as Abdul, Tim McInnerny and Roy Castle, and were directed by Paul Weiland.

A variant of the poem appeared in an ad for Springmaid cotton sheets in Life magazine, 7 January 1952.

In popular culture 

In the film Tiger Shark (1932) directed by Howard Hawks and starring Edward G. Robinson, a loose adaptation of Moby Dick, the fishermen of San Diego are depicted singing the song.

In the closing scene of the 1937 film The Devil's Playground, Richard Dix (Jack Dorgan) and Chester Morris (Robert Mason) are singing verses while riding a rickshaw in China.

The comic strip Alley Oop featured the fight in a 1956 storyline, from 3–21 December.  In it, Alley fights on Abdul's behalf; however, during the fight, Abdul runs away with the coffee girl.  Alley and Ivan therefore stop fighting to make more coffee, but Alley is whisked away via time-machine (the sight of which sends Ivan fleeing in panic).  The puzzled onlookers realize that no one will believe what actually happened, and they decide to say instead that the two original combatants, Abdul and Ivan, fought to the death.

In the 1969 Arthur Penn film Alice's Restaurant, at the introduction of the character of Ray (played by James Broderick) he is singing the second verse of the song.

Bing Crosby included the song in a medley on his album 101 Gang Songs (1961). Country singer Hank Thompson recorded the song on his final album, Seven Decades (2000).

In the Star Trek: The Next Generation episode "Brothers", the character Lore is heard singing verses of the song as he murders Noonien Soong, commenting "I've always loved that old ditty".

References

External links
 The Cartoon
 Song by Frank Crumit, 1927
 

1877 poems
1877 songs
English-language poems
Songs about death
Songs about fictional male characters
Songs about Turkey
Songs about Russia
Songs written by Percy French
Fictional rivalries
Russo-Turkish War (1877–1878)